Alison Blomfield Pickmere (1908–1971) was a New Zealand secretary, interior decorator and artist. She was born in Auckland, New Zealand in 1908.

References

1908 births
1971 deaths
People from Auckland
New Zealand artists